The Bank of Alamo, at 103 S. Bells St. in Alamo, Tennessee, is a two-story brick building with limestone trim.  It was listed on the National Register of Historic Places in 1986.

The bank was founded in 1902 and built this building in 1912 in Classical Revival style.  Elements of its neo-classical style include "shouldered architrave limestone window surrounds, the limestone door surround with scroll brackets and cornice, and the limestone cornice on the exterior and by the pressed tin ceiling, mosaic tile floor, and window trim on the interior."

References

Bank buildings on the National Register of Historic Places in Tennessee
National Register of Historic Places in Crockett County, Tennessee
Neoclassical architecture in Tennessee
Buildings and structures completed in 1912